John Bettesthorne  (c. 1329 – 6 February 1399) of Bisterne, Hampshire and Chaddenwick in Mere, Wiltshire, was an English politician.

He was a Member (MP) of the Parliament of England for Wiltshire in February 1388 and for Hampshire in January 1390.

References

1329 births
1399 deaths
14th-century English politicians
English MPs February 1388
English MPs January 1390
People from New Forest District
People from Mere, Wiltshire